Head to Toe is an extended play (EP) by American alternative rock band the Breeders. It was released in July 1994 on Elektra Records and 4AD, peaking at number 68 on the UK Singles Chart. The EP contains a cover of Guided by Voices' "Shocker in Gloomtown," which helped ignite interest in the band. It also contains a cover of Sebadoh's "Freed Pig", a song written about producer J Mascis.

Track listing

References

The Breeders albums
1994 EPs
4AD EPs
Elektra Records EPs